Chris Bernard (born 20 October 1955) is an English film director. He has directed eight films since 1985.

He was born in Liverpool, England and started his professional career in the theatre. In 1977 he developed an old warehouse, in  Matthew Street, Liverpool into a theatre venue and was a founder member and Company Manager of the acclaimed Science Fiction Theatre of Liverpool which went on to open the National Theatre- Cottesloe Theatre with their celebrated production of ILLUMINATUS! Written and directed by Ken Campbell & Chris Langham and starring Prunella Gee, Jim Broadbent and David Rappaport.

Bernard directed his first play The Immortalist by Heathcote Williams and went on to direct others, most notably The Maids by Jean Genet, Lainey Robertson's The Insanity of Mary Girard and Heroes, about the war poet Wilfred Owen.

After working as a script writer for the Channel 4 soap opera Brookside, his debut film was Letter to Brezhnev.

Selected filmography
 Letter to Brezhnev (1985)

References

External links

Outsider Film Festival.com

1955 births
Living people
English film directors
Film people from Liverpool